Eura Airfield  is an airfield in Eura, Finland, about  south west of Eura centre. It is operated by Kauttuan Ilmailukerho r.y. (Kauttua Aviation Club).

See also
List of airports in Finland

References

External links

 Kauttua Aviation Club – Eura Airfield
 VFR Suomi/Finland – Eura Airfield
 Lentopaikat.net – Eura Airfield 

Airports in Finland
Airfield
Buildings and structures in Satakunta